The Kentucky Gazette, or Kentucke Gazette, was the first newspaper published in the state of Kentucky. It was started in Lexington by Fielding and John Bradford in 1787 (as Kentucke Gazette), and continued into 1789 with the current spelling of the state.

Currently, the newspaper is published in Frankfort and released every other Wednesday.

External links
 
 https://www.loc.gov/rr/news/18th/87.html

Newspapers published in Kentucky
1787 establishments in Virginia